António Teixeira de Sousa, 2nd Count of Sousa Palmela (5 May 1857 in Celeirós, Sabrosa – 5 June 1917 in Celeirós, Sabrosa) was a Portuguese medical doctor and politician during the Constitutional Monarchy. He graduated in Medicine at the University of Porto, in 1883. 
A member of the conservative Regenerator Party, he was first elected to the Chamber of Deputies, in 1889. He was later minister of the Navy and Overseas (1900–1903), and, twice, of Finance (1903–1904, 1906). He became President of the Council of Ministers (Prime Minister) on 26 June 1910, and would be the last Prime Minister of the Constitutional Monarchy as King D. Manuel II was overthrown by a republican revolution on 5 October 1910. He left politics after the republic proclamation, but showed a moderate support for the new regime.

1857 births
1917 deaths
People from Sabrosa
Portuguese nobility
Regenerator Party politicians
Prime Ministers of Portugal
Finance ministers of Portugal
19th-century Portuguese physicians
20th-century Portuguese physicians
University of Porto alumni
Naval ministers of Portugal